Apronal (brand name Sedormid), or apronalide, also known as allylisopropylacetylurea or allylisopropylacetylcarbamide, is a hypnotic/sedative drug of the ureide (acylurea) group synthesized in 1926 by Hoffmann-La Roche that is no longer used except in Japan (See Japanese article). Though it is not a barbiturate, apronalide is similar in structure to the barbiturates (being an open-chain carbamide instead of having a heterocyclic ring). In accordance, it is similar in action to the barbiturates, although considerably milder in comparison (formerly used as a daytime sedative at doses of 1 to 2 grams every 3 to 4 hours). Upon the finding that it caused patients to develop thrombocytopenic purpura, apronalide was withdrawn from clinical use.

See also
 Bromoureide

References

Alkene derivatives
GABAA receptor positive allosteric modulators
Hypnotics
Sedatives
Ureas
Withdrawn drugs